Guillermo Mackenna (born 1974) is a Chilean lawyer who served as the president of Blanco y Negro from March 2010 to March 2011.

In 2018, he was proposed as candidate for being member of the Patrimonial Court of the Asociación Nacional de Fútbol Profesional (ANFP), which was dismissed.

References

External links
 Profile at VialAbogados

1974 births
Living people
Chilean people
Chilean people of Irish descent
Gabriela Mistral University alumni
Northwestern University alumni
Presidents of Blanco y Negro S.A.
Guillermo